María Isa Pérez-Vega (born May 5, 1987) is an American politician serving in the Minnesota House of Representatives since 2023. A member of the Minnesota Democratic-Farmer-Labor Party (DFL), Pérez-Vega represents District 65B in the Twin Cities metropolitan area, which includes the cities of Saint Paul and West St. Paul and parts of Dakota and Ramsey Counties in Minnesota.

Early life, education and career 
Pérez-Vega attended Columbia College Chicago earning a degree in cultural studies.

Minnesota House of Representatives 
Pérez-Vega was first elected to the Minnesota House of Representatives in 2022, after redistricting and the retirement of DFL incumbent Carlos Mariani.

Electoral history

Personal life 
Pérez-Vega lives in Saint Paul, Minnesota, and has one child. She is of Puerto Rican descent.

References

External links 

Living people
1987 births
21st-century American politicians
21st-century American women politicians
Democratic Party members of the Minnesota House of Representatives
Columbia College Chicago alumni
Politicians from Saint Paul, Minnesota
Hispanic and Latino American politicians
Hispanic and Latino American women in politics
Hispanic and Latino American state legislators
American politicians of Puerto Rican descent